Graumann is a surname. Notable people with the surname include:

Johann Philipp Graumann, a Prussian business mathematician and monetary theorist
Sid Grauman, American showman
Grauman's Chinese Theatre, a movie theater in Hollywood, named after Sid Grauman
Grauman's Egyptian Theatre, a movie theater in Hollywood, named after Sid Grauman
Walter Grauman, American director of stage shows, theatrical films and television shows